Monroe Randolph Stark (January 19, 1885 – December 1, 1924) was a college baseball coach and professional baseball player who coached the Mississippi A&M Aggies, now known as the Mississippi State Bulldogs to a 22–4 record in 1909. He then went on to play shortstop for the Cleveland Naps and Brooklyn Dodgers from 1909 to 1912.

Stark was killed by gunfire in Memphis, Tennessee and is buried at Elmwood Cemetery in Memphis.

Baseball coaching record

References

External links

1885 births
1924 deaths
1924 murders in the United States
Augusta Dollies players
Augusta Georgians players
Baseball players from Mississippi
Brooklyn Dodgers players
Brooklyn Superbas players
Buffalo Bisons (minor league) players
Clarksville Grays players
Cleveland Naps players
Dayton Veterans players
Deaths by firearm in Tennessee
Little Rock Travelers players
Major League Baseball shortstops
American murder victims
Memphis Chickasaws players
Minor league baseball managers
Mississippi State Bulldogs baseball coaches
Nashville Vols players
Newark Indians players
Okmulgee Drillers players
People murdered in Tennessee
Sacramento Sacts players
San Antonio Bronchos players
Tecumseh (minor league baseball) players
People from Ripley, Mississippi